Wales football team may refer to:

 Wales national football team
 Wales national under-21 football team
 Wales national under-20 football team
 Wales national under-19 football team
 Wales national under-18 football team
 Wales national under-17 football team
 Wales women's national football team
 Wales national semi-professional football team